Borobudur Temple Compounds is the World Heritage designation of the area of three Buddhist temples in Central Java, Indonesia. It comprises Borobudur, Mendut, and Pawon. The temples were built during the Shailendra dynasty around the 8th and 9th centuries CE, and fall on a straight line.

According to local myth, the area known as Kedu Plain is a Javanese sacred place and has been dubbed 'the garden of Java' due to its high agricultural fertility.

Alignment

During restoration in the early 20th century, it was discovered that three Buddhist temples in the region, Borobudur, Pawon and Mendut, fall on a straight line. This may be coincidence, but is in agreement with a native folk tale that there was an ancient brick road from Borobudur to Mendut with walls on both sides. The three temples have similar architecture and ornamentation, which suggests a ritual relationship between them to form a sacred unity, although the exact ritual process is unknown.

Museums 
There are two museums within Borobudur Temple Compounds, Karmawibhangga Museum and Samudra Raksa Museum.

Other archaeological sites 

Other Buddhist temples and Hindu temples are scattered in the area. The earliest is Gunung Wukir or Canggal Hindu temple dated 732 CE.

Ngawen temple is found to the east of Mendut temple.

The ruin of Banon temple, a Hindu temple, is several hundred meters north of Pawon temple. It could not be reconstructed because many stones are missing, but several stone statues of Hindu gods were found in good condition. Those of Vishnu, Brahma, Shiva, and Ganesha are now at the National Museum of Indonesia, Jakarta.

See also

 Angkor
 Buddhism in Indonesia
 Candi of Indonesia
 Greater India
 Gunung Padang Megalithic Site, in Western Java, part of which was developed during the Sunda Kingdom
 Hinduism in Java
 History of Indian influence on Southeast Asia
 Indonesian Esoteric Buddhism
 Prambanan Temple Compounds, UNESCO heritage listed 6th to 9th century CE Hindu temple in Central Java built by Shailendra dynasty of Mataram Kingdom
 Sunda Kingdom, Sundanese Hindu kingdom from 669 to 1579 CE in western and central Java including Gunung adang site.

Notes

External links
 

Archaeoastronomy
Archaeological sites in Indonesia
Former Buddhist temples
World Heritage Sites in Indonesia
Buddhist temples in Indonesia
 Buddhist pilgrimage sites in Indonesia
 Borobudur